C. Ve. Shanmugam is an Indian politician and Currently he is a  Member of Parliament (Rajya Sabha) from Tamil Nadu. He was a former member of the Tamil Nadu Legislative Assembly from Villupuram constituency. As a cadre of Anna Dravida Munnetra Kazhagam, he was previously elected to the Tindivanam constituency in 2001 and 2006 elections. He also served as the state's Minister of Education, Law and Commercial Taxes from 2003 to 2006 and from 2011 to 2013 under the leadership of the Chief Minister Jayalalitha. His father was a previous member of the parliament for the Vandhavasi constituency.

He served as the party district secretary for 10 years. He won the 2016 elections in Villupuram constituency again and was appointed Minister of Law and Prisons. In 2017 he was again made a district secretary of AIADMK for Villupuram district.

He contested again in Viluppuram constituency but he was defeated by 14,868 votes by R. Lakshmanan.
He was arrested on 7th April, 2022 for protesting against the cancellation of many subsidy schemes in Tamil Nadu.

References 

All India Anna Dravida Munnetra Kazhagam politicians
Living people
Year of birth missing (living people)
Tamil Nadu MLAs 2001–2006
Tamil Nadu MLAs 2006–2011
Tamil Nadu MLAs 2011–2016
Tamil Nadu MLAs 2016–2021